Sandy Lloyd is a former West Indian cricket umpire. He stood in three Test matches between 1958 and 1960.

See also
 List of Test cricket umpires

References

Year of birth missing (living people)
Living people
Place of birth missing (living people)
West Indian Test cricket umpires